Hues may refer to:

Jack Hues (born 1954), English musician best known for forming the 1980s band Wang Chung
Matthias Hues (born 1959), German-born, American actor and martial artist
Robert Hues (1553–1632), English mathematician and geographer
Hues (album), a 1973 live album by American jazz saxophonist Sam Rivers

See also
Hue (disambiguation)
Hue (name)